VS is a nerve agent of the V-series. Its chemical structure is very similar to the VX nerve agent, but the methyl group on the phosphorus atom is replaced by an ethyl group.

See also
VX (nerve agent)

References

V-series nerve agents
Acetylcholinesterase inhibitors
Diisopropylamino compounds
Ethyl esters